Joseph R. Walsh (November 5, 1864 – August 8, 1911) was a Major League Baseball player. He batted left and threw right-handed.

He was born in Chicago, Illinois, and died in Omaha, Nebraska.

External links

1864 births
1911 deaths
Major League Baseball shortstops
Baltimore Orioles (AA) players
19th-century baseball players
Oswego Starchboxes players
Omaha Omahogs players
Minneapolis Millers (baseball) players
Milwaukee Brewers (minor league) players
Milwaukee Creams players
Omaha Lambs players
Ishpeming-Nagaunee Unions players
Columbus Reds players
Marinette Badgers players
Chattanooga Warriors players
Sioux City Cornhuskers players
Des Moines Prohibitionists players
Des Moines Indians players
Baseball players from Chicago